Shirley Murdock (born May 22, 1957) is an American R&B singer-songwriter, who is best known for her 1986 R&B hit single "As We Lay" and for her vocals on Zapp and Roger's hit single "Computer Love". Her lead vocal special guest appearance with Smooth Jazz artist  Ben Tankard, climbed to #1 Gospel and  #20 on Billboard Top 200 on WOW Gospel 2006 and is certified Gold. Their collaboration of the Lionel Richie  song "Jesus Is Love" is one of the most played songs on Sirius XM Radio gospel channel for eight years since its initial release.

Career
Murdock started out singing gospel music in her native Toledo. Singer/musician Roger Troutman hired Murdock as a backing singer for his family's band Zapp, which had several hits on Warner Bros. (and its Reprise Records imprint). Based on this success, Troutman began recording tracks with Murdock and lead singer Sugarfoot of the Ohio Players, among others, at his Dayton-based recording studio, Troutman Sound Labs. Murdock and Troutman's first chart single was a Warner Bros. single issued as Roger (featuring Shirley Murdock), "Girl, Cut It Out", which charted at number 79 R&B in early 1985.

Murdock signed with Elektra Records and released "No More", written by Shirley Murdock and Gregory Jackson (Cincinnati, Ohio funk keyboardist and member of Zapp), which made it to number 24 R&B in early 1986. Then came her signature hit, "As We Lay", written by Zapp's Larry Troutman and keyboardist Billy Beck (of the Ohio Players). The tender, melancholy ballad made it to the R&B Top Ten in 1986 and peaked at number 23 pop and number 21 on the adult contemporary chart in early 1987. Her debut album went gold, also helped along by the follow-up hits "Go on Without You" and "Be Free." She also released albums in 1988 (A Woman's Point of View) and 1991 (Let There Be Love!). In early 2000, Murdock toured in the inspirational/gospel play Be Careful What You Pray For with Cuba Gooding, Sr. and David Peaston.

Murdock released Home, her gospel-music debut album, in 2002 on T.D. Jakes' Dexterity Sounds record label. She made her acting debut in the movie Sweating in the Spirit. Most recently, Murdock has signed with Tyscot Records and released her most recent album in March 2007.

In 2009, Murdock collaborated with Teena Marie on the song "Soldier", from Marie's album Congo Square. She also appeared in the 2009 stage play A Mother's Prayer, with Johnny Gill, Robin Givens, and Jermaine Crawford. She also appeared in "A Mother's Love" a stage play produced by Kandi Burruss and Todd Tucker in 2014.

Discography

Studio albums

Live albums

Compilation albums

Singles

References

External links
Shirley Murdock official website

1957 births
Musicians from Toledo, Ohio
Living people
20th-century African-American women singers
American gospel singers
American rhythm and blues singers
Singers from Ohio
Elektra Records artists
Zapp (band) members
21st-century American women singers
Ballad musicians
21st-century American singers
21st-century African-American women singers